Nuestra Belleza Aguascalientes 2011 was held in the Hotel Marriott, Aguascalientes, Aguascalientes on July 7, 2011. At the conclusion of the final night of competition Karina González of Aguascalientes City was crowned the winner. González was crowned by outgoing Nuestra Belleza Aguascalientes titleholder Estefanía Herrera. Seven contestants competed for the title.

Results

Placements

Contestants

Contestants notes
Karina González won the Reina de la feria Nacional de San Marcos 2010 contest. She also obtained the 2011 Nuestra Belleza México title and will compete in Miss Universe 2012.
Gabriela Delgado was designated to participate in Nuestra Belleza México 2011 and placed into the semifinals, competed in Swimsuit and Evening Gown, finishing 6th overall.
Roberta Sanchez won the title La Catrina 2010 and was the queen for the 2010 Festival Internacional de las Calaveras.

References

External links
Official Website

Nuestra Belleza México